The Roman Catholic Archdiocese of Mbandaka-Bikoro is the Metropolitan See for the Latin Rite Ecclesiastical province of Mbandaka-Bikoro, in the western part of Democratic Republic of the Congo. It is under the authority of the Congregation for the Evangelization of Peoples.
 
The cathedral archiepiscopal see is at the Cathedral of St. Eugene, in Mbandaka, Équateur Province.

Statistics 
As per 2015, it pastorally served 646,000 Catholics (52.4% of 1,232,000 total population) on 95,000 km² in 34 parishes with 87 priests (56 diocesan, 31 religious), 238 lay religious (82 brothers, 156 sisters) and 42 seminarians.

History 
 Established on 1924.02.11 as Apostolic Prefecture of Tsuapa, on colonial territory split off from the Apostolic Vicariate of Nouvelle-Anvers
 1926.01.28: Renamed after its see as Apostolic Prefecture of Coquilhatstad=Coquilhatville, having gained more territory from the above Apostolic Vicariate of Nouvelle-Anvers
 1931.01.03: Lost territory to establish the Mission sui juris of Bikoro (later a diocese, now merged-in with its title)
 Promoted on 1932.03.22 as Apostolic Vicariate of Coquilhatville
 1951.06.14: Lost territory to establish the Apostolic Prefecture of Isangi (now a diocese in Kisangani province)
 Promoted on 1959.11.10 as Metropolitan Archdiocese of Coquilhatville 
 1961.09.11: Lost territory to establish the Diocese of Ikela (now its suffragan as Diocese of Bokungu–Ikela)
 1966.05.30: Renamed with its see as Metropolitan Archdiocese of Mbandaka
 1975.04.12: Renamed as Metropolitan Archdiocese of Mbandaka–Bikoro, having gained territory from the suppressed Diocese of Bikoro whose title was merged in

Ecclesiastical Province 
Its suffragan sees are :
 Roman Catholic Diocese of Basankusu
 Roman Catholic Diocese of Bokungu–Ikela, originally Ikela
 Roman Catholic Diocese of Budjala
 Roman Catholic Diocese of Lisala
 Roman Catholic Diocese of Lolo
 Roman Catholic Diocese of Molegbe

Bishops

Ordinaries 
Apostolic Prefect of Coquilhatville  
 Edoardo van Goethem, Sacred Heart Missionaries (M.S.C.) (born Belgium) (1924.02.25 – 1932.03.22 see below)

Apostolic Vicars of Coquilhatville  
 Edoardo van Goethem, M.S.C. (see above 1932.03.22 – retired 1946), Titular Bishop of Corone (1932.11.29 – death 1949.05.26)
 Hilaire Marie Vermeiren, M.S.C. (born Belgium) (1947.04.10 – 1959.11.10 see below), Titular Bishop of Gibba (1947.04.10 – 1959.11.10)

Metropolitan Archbishops of Coquilhatville 
 Hilaire Marie Vermeiren, M.S.C. (see above 1959.11.10 – retired 1963.04.08), emeritate as Titular Archbishop of Pedachtoë (1963.04.08 – death 1967.08.18)
 Pierre Wijnants, M.S.C. (born Belgium) (1964.04.21 – 1966.05.30 see below)

Metropolitan Archbishop of Mbandaka 
 Pierre Wijnants, M.S.C. (see above 1966.05.30 – 1975.04.12 see below)

Metropolitan Archbishops of Mbandaka-Bikoro 
 Pierre Wijnants, M.S.C. (see above 1975.04.12 – retired 1977.11.11), died 1978
 Frédéric Etsou-Nzabi-Bamungwabi, Scheutists (C.I.C.M.) (first native Congolese incumbent) (1977.11.11 – 1990.07.07), succeeding as former Titular Archbishop of Menefessi(1976.07.08 – 1977.11.11) as Coadjutor Archbishop of Mbandaka–Bikoro (1976.07.08 – 1977.11.11); later staying on a while as Apostolic Administrator of Mbandaka–Bikoro (1990.07.07 – 1991.10.11) while Metropolitan Archbishop of Kinshasa (1990.07.07 – death 2007.01.06), created Cardinal-Priest of S. Lucia a Piazza d’Armi (1991.06.28 – 2007.01.06), President of National Episcopal Conference of Congo (2000 – 2004)
 Joseph Kumuondala Mbimba (1991.10.11 - death 2016.03.06), also Apostolic Administrator of Diocese of Bokungu–Ikela (Congo-Kinshasa) (1991.10.11 – 1993), Apostolic Administrator of Diocese of Molegbe (Congo-Kinshasa) (1997 – 1998.06.27); previously Titular Bishop of Simidicca (1980.11.29 – 1982.03.18) as Auxiliary Bishop of Diocese of Bokungu–Ikela (Congo-Kinshasa) (1980.11.29 – 1982.03.18), succeeding as Bishop of Bokungu–Ikela (1982.03.18 – 1991.10.11)
 Fridolin Ambongo Besungu, Capuchin Franciscans (O.F.M. Cap.) (2016.11.12 – 2018.02.06), also Vice-President of National Episcopal Conference of Congo (2016.06.24 – ...), Apostolic Administrator of Diocese of Bokungu–Ikela (Congo-Kinshasa) (2016.11.12 – 2018.02.06); previously Bishop of above Bokungu–Ikela (2004.11.22 – 2016.11.12), also Apostolic Administrator of Diocese of Kole (Congo-Kinshasa) (2008.10.30 – 2015.05.06), Apostolic Administrator of Mbandaka–Bikoro (2016.03.05 – succession 2016.11.12); next Coadjutor Archbishop of Kinshasa (Congo-Kinshasa) (2018.02.06 – 2018.11.01), Archbishop of Kinshasa (2018.11.01 - ...); created Cardinal-Priest of San Gabriele Arcangelo all'Acqua Traversa (2019.10.05)
Ernest Ngboko Ngombe, C.I.C.M. (2019.11.23 - present); previously, Bishop of Lisala (2015.02.11 - 2019.11.23)

Coadjutor bishop
Frédéric Etsou-Nzabi-Bamungwabi, C.I.C.M. (1976-1977); future Cardinal

See also 
 List of Catholic dioceses in the Democratic Republic of the Congo
 Roman Catholicism in the Democratic Republic of the Congo

References

External links 
 GCatholic.org, with Google satellite HQ photo - data for all sections

Mbandaka
Roman Catholic dioceses in the Democratic Republic of the Congo
Religious organizations established in 1924
Roman Catholic dioceses and prelatures established in the 20th century